Achalinus ater, commonly known as Bourret's odd-scaled snake, is a species of snake in the family Xenodermatidae.

The species is found in northern Vietnam and China in Guizhou and Guangxi.

References

Xenodermidae
Snakes of China
Snakes of Vietnam
Reptiles described in 1937
Taxa named by René Léon Bourret